Telingan was a term in British Victorian racial science, now discredited, referring a subset of the inhabitants "the eastern parts of India, especially about Calcutta, several isolated spots in other parts of India, and the east coast of Madagascar.":

References

British India
History of India
Race (human categorization)
Scientific racism
Victorian era